Fey Truscott-Sade, also known as Fey or Feyde, is a fictional character who appeared in the Doctor Who Magazine comic strip based on the long-running British science fiction television series Doctor Who. She was a companion of the Eighth Doctor. The character was created by writer Alan Barnes and artists Martin Geraghty and Robin Smith.

Publication history 
She first appears in the comic strip story "Tooth and Claw," published in DWM #257-260, written by Alan Barnes and drawn by Martin Geraghty and Robin Smith. Her initial appearance in that story was inspired by Katharine Hepburn.

Fictional character biography
Fey is a native of Earth in the early 20th century. In 1939, she is an undercover operative working for the British government and has previously encountered the Doctor in an unpublished adventure involving psychic weasels in Russell Square. The Doctor had given her a Stattenheim Summoner—a device disguised as a tin whistle that could contact the TARDIS—and Fey calls on the Doctor and his companion Izzy Sinclair to help her investigate the sinister Varney.

Varney takes people to his private island to wait out the coming war in safety, but the fate of those guests is a total mistery. It was here Fey met Izzy Sinclair, another friend of the Doctor.

The events of Tooth and Claw prove costly for the Doctor. Although they ultimately defeat Varney, the Doctor injects himself with a deadly bacillus in the process. Fey manages to pilot the TARDIS back to Gallifrey, where the Doctor's body is cured, and his mind placed into the Matrix to heal. Izzy came along for the trip.

While within the Matrix, an attempt is made on the Doctor's life by "the Elysians", a secret Time Lord sect. This is foiled by Shayde, a construct of the Matrix and an old ally of the Doctor's. The assassination attempt is part of a plot by Overseer Luther, an insane Time Lord who wants to rewrite Gallifrey's history and set himself up as a god. The Doctor manages to thwart him by short-circuiting his watchtower (a gigantic TARDIS), but apparently at the cost of his eighth body. As Izzy and Fey watch, the Doctor regenerates into a new incarnation (The Final Chapter, DWM #262-#265).

However, this is a ruse. The Doctor had realized that Fey was under external control when she managed to pilot the TARDIS even though the TARDIS manual was in Gallifreyan script, which she did not understand. Just before the Doctor prepared to sacrifice himself, Shayde offered to take his place and fake a regeneration. This way, the group that was controlling Fey — the Threshold, a mercenary organization that the Doctor had tangled with before — would seize the opportunity to bring a newly regenerated and thus weaker Doctor to them. Both disguised with personal chameleon circuits, Shayde would hold their attention while the Doctor sabotaged the Threshold's operations.

In a Wild West town on an alien moon run by the Threshold, the Doctor's plans come to fruition. The Threshold removes an implant from Fey, gloating that she had been an unwitting spy for them ever since they kidnapped her in 1937 and placed the device in her head. Preparing for the final confrontation, Shayde and the Doctor reveal themselves to the Threshold. However, Shayde has to contend with the Pariah, an immensely powerful being and a prototype version of himself. Shayde is unable to defeat the Pariah on his own, and she crushes his skull.

Comforting the dying Shayde, Fey merges with the Gallifreyan construct and together they are able to kill the Pariah and eliminate the Threshold. The shared being, dubbed "Feyde" by the Doctor, as both of them retain their own consciousness, decides to leave and deal with what had just happened to them (Wormwood, DWM #266-#271).

Fey returns to 1939, where she continues to work for the British government. Fey spends two years fighting the Nazis with Shayde, frustrated that Shayde does not allow her to use their powers to kill Adolf Hitler, as this would change history. In 1941, she receives a sub-ether summons from the Doctor — Izzy had been kidnapped, and the Doctor needs Shayde's abilities to track her whereabouts. Together, they succeed in recovering Izzy, and "Feyde" returns to World War II after sharing a farewell kiss with her (Oblivion, DWM #323-#328).

As a merged entity, Fey is able to share Shayde's powers, including the ability to travel through time and space unaided, phase through solid objects and fire self-generated "psychic bullets". Fey's penchant for dressing in masculine clothing and her relationship with Izzy implies that she is a lesbian, but her actual orientation is never made explicit. However, given certain pieces of dialogue with the Doctor, there is evidence that she is actually bisexual. Fey and Shayde also develop a love/hate relationship over the course of their unison. Fey seems to like Shayde, but often resents his unswerving loyalty to Rassilon and preserving the web of time.

External links

Comics characters introduced in 1997
Doctor Who spin-off companions
Doctor Who comic strip characters
Female characters in comics
Fictional bisexual females
LGBT characters in comics